Nongalbibra is a small town in South Garo Hills, Meghalaya, India, famous for its coal mines. The great river of Garo Hills, the Simsang River passes through it. Majority of the sino-tibetan speaking community of the Garos are present. Who are called the Atongs. 

Cities and towns in East Garo Hills district
Coal mines in India